The 2018–19 FC St. Pauli season is the 108th season in the football club's history and 8th consecutive season in the second division of German football, the 2. Bundesliga and 26th overall. In addition to the domestic league, FC St. Pauli also are participating in this season's edition of the domestic cup, the DFB-Pokal. This is the 56th season for FC St. Pauli in the Millerntor-Stadion, located in St. Pauli, Hamburg, Germany. The season covers a period from 1 July 2018 to 30 June 2019.

Players

Squad information

Transfers

Summer

In:

Out:

Winter

In:

Out:

Matches

Legend

Friendly matches

2. Bundesliga

League table

Results summary

Results by round

Matches

DFB-Pokal

Squad and statistics

! colspan="13" style="background:#DCDCDC; text-align:center" | Players transferred out during the season
|-

|}

References

FC St. Pauli seasons
St. Pauli